The 2018 Asian Alpine Ski Championships were the 27th Asian Alpine Ski Championships and took place from March 4–6, 2018, in Darbandsar Ski Resort, Darband Sar, Iran.

Medal summary

Men

Women

Medal table

References

External links
Results

Alpine Ski Championships
Asian
Asian Alpine Ski Championships
International sports competitions hosted by Iran
March 2018 sports events in Iran